Doucement may refer to:

Music
"Doucement" (Liane Foly song)
"Doucement" (Makassy song)
"Doucement", by Mac Tyer
"Doucement", by Henri Salvador
"Doucement", by Michel Jonasz
"Doucement", by Roch Voisine